Leonard J. Hall (born January 23, 1943) was an American politician in the state of Florida.

Hall was born in Tifton, Georgia and came to Florida in 1950. He served in the Florida House of Representatives from November 7, 1978, to November 2, 1982 (9th district).

References

1943 births
Living people
Democratic Party members of the Florida House of Representatives
People from Tifton, Georgia
People from Panama City, Florida
Educators from Florida